Andreas Lasnik (born 9 November 1983) is an Austrian footballer. He now works as a glasses seller.

Club career
Lasnik came up through the youth system of FK Lankowitz. He broke into the professional level in 2001 with ASK Köflach. In 2001, he was signed by SV Ried of the Austrian first division, the Österreichische Fußball-Bundesliga.  He would appear in over 80 matches with the club and net 14 goals. In 2005, he was signed by FK Austria Wien where he played until the end of the 2007–08 season. After that season, he signed a three-year-contract for the German Second division club Alemannia Aachen After the end of his contract on 30 June 2010, he left Alemannia Aachen. Lasnik signed on 26 June 2010 with Dutch club Willem II Tilburg.

International career
He made his debut for Austria in an October 2005 friendly match against England, coming on for the last ten minutes of his only international so far.

Honours
Austria Wien
 Austrian Football Bundesliga: 2005–06
 Austrian Cup: 2005–06, 2006–07

SV Ried

 Austrian Football First League: 2004–05

References

External links
 
 
 Andreas Lasnik Interview

1983 births
Living people
People from Voitsberg
Austrian footballers
Austria international footballers
Austrian expatriate footballers
SV Ried players
FK Austria Wien players
Alemannia Aachen players
Willem II (football club) players
NAC Breda players
Panionios F.C. players
Kapfenberger SV players
Austrian Football Bundesliga players
Eredivisie players
2. Bundesliga players
Expatriate footballers in Germany
Expatriate footballers in the Netherlands
Association football midfielders
Footballers from Styria